The Cricket on the Hearth is a 1923 American silent comedy film directed by Lorimer Johnston and starring Josef Swickard, Fritzi Ridgeway, and Paul Gerson.

Cast

Preservation
Prints of The Cricket on the Hearth are in the Archives Du Film Du CNC in Bois d'Arcy, UCLA Film and Television Archive, and Library of Congress.

References

Bibliography
 Glavin, John. Dickens on Screen. Cambridge University Press, 2003.

External links

1923 films
1923 comedy films
1920s English-language films
American silent feature films
Silent American comedy films
Films based on works by Charles Dickens
Films directed by Lorimer Johnston
Films set in England
American black-and-white films
Selznick Pictures films
1920s American films